There have been two professional basketball leagues known as the National Professional Basketball League.

National Professional Basketball League (1950–51)
National Professional Basketball League (2007–08)